Properigea niveirena is a species of moth in the family Noctuidae. It was described by Leon F. Harvey in 1876 and is found in North America, where it ranges from Vancouver Island, through western British Columbia, Washington and Oregon south to California and the border with Mexico, then east to New Mexico through southern Arizona.

The wingspan is 28–32 mm. The forewings are dark grey with a white-rimmed crescent-shaped reniform spot. The hindwings are medium-dark grey, darker toward the margin, with dark veins and terminal line. Adults are on wing from July to early August.

The larvae probably feed on herbaceous plants.

The MONA or Hodges number for Properigea niveirena is 9596.

References

Further reading
 Arnett, Ross H. (2000). American Insects: A Handbook of the Insects of America North of Mexico. CRC Press.
 Lafontaine, J. Donald & Schmidt, B. Christian (2010). "Annotated check list of the Noctuoidea (Insecta, Lepidoptera) of North America north of Mexico". ZooKeys, vol. 40, 1-239.

External links
NCBI Taxonomy Browser, Properigea niveirena

Noctuinae
Moths described in 1876

Taxa named by Leon F. Harvey
Moths of North America